Dmitriy Tsutskarev (born January 1, 1976) is an Uzbek former swimmer, who specialized in butterfly events. Tsutskarev competed only in the men's 200 m butterfly at the 2000 Summer Olympics in Sydney. He achieved a FINA B-cut of 2:05.60 from the Kazakhstan Open Championships in Almaty. He challenged five other swimmers in heat one, including Ecuador's two-time Olympian Roberto Delgado. He edged out Syria's Fadi Kouzmah to race for the fifth seed by 1.02 seconds in 2:10.54. Tsustkarev failed to advance into the semifinals, as he placed forty-fifth overall in the prelims.

References

1976 births
Living people
Uzbekistani male butterfly swimmers
Olympic swimmers of Uzbekistan
Swimmers at the 2000 Summer Olympics
Sportspeople from Tashkent
20th-century Uzbekistani people
21st-century Uzbekistani people